Inverclyde North is one of the seven wards used to elect members of the Inverclyde Council. It elects four Councillors.

The ward includes northern areas of Greenock, predominantly the town's West End and all streets between Lyle Hill and the Firth of Clyde up to the boundary with Gourock, plus part of the town centre (north of the Inverclyde Line railway tracks, west of Bank Street, north of Wellington Street). In 2019, the ward had a population of 13,759.

Councillors

Election Results

2022 Election
2022 Inverclyde Council election

2017 Election
2017 Inverclyde Council election

2012 Election
2012 Inverclyde Council election

2007 Election
2007 Inverclyde Council election

References

Wards of Inverclyde
Greenock
Firth of Clyde